But-1-ene (or 1-butylene) is the organic compound with the formula CH3CH2CH=CH2. It is a colorless gas that is easily condensed to give a colorless liquid. It is classified as a linear alpha-olefin. It is one of the isomers of butene (butylene). It is a precursor to diverse products.

Reactions
Polymerization of but-1-ene gives polybutylene, which is used to make piping for domestic plumbing. Another application is as a comonomer in the production of certain kinds of polyethylene, such as linear low-density polyethylene (LLDPE).  It has also been used as a precursor to polypropylene resins, butylene oxide, and butanone.

Manufacturing
But-1-ene is produced by separation from crude C4 refinery streams and by ethylene dimerization. The former affords a mixture of 1-and 2-butenes, while the latter affords only the terminal alkene. It is distilled to give a very high purity product. An estimated 12 billion kilograms were produced in 2011.

See also
Dimer (chemistry)
Octene

References

Alkenes

es:Buteno#El 1-buteno